Gusakov, female form Gusakova, is a Russian surname originating from the word Гусь, meaning goose.

Notable people
Notable people having this surname include:
 Boris Gusakov, Soviet serial killer (1938–1970)
 Dimitri Gusakov (born 1971), Russian politician
 Maria Gusakova (born 1931), Soviet skier
 Nikolay Gusakov (1934–1993), Soviet skier
 Yuri Gusakov (born 1969), Russian footballer

References

Russian-language surnames